Lianran Subdistrict is a subdistrict and the county seat of Anning City, Yunnan, China. It lies in west of Kunming, located on the bank of Tanglang River.

Anning, Yunnan
Township-level divisions of Kunming